Antônio Delfim Netto (born May 1, 1928) is a Brazilian economist, former Minister of Finance, Agriculture, and Planning of Brazil, professor and congressman. During his incumbency as Minister of Finance of Brazil, the country experienced the so-called Milagre Econômico (the Economic Miracle), a time of unprecedented economic growth. 

The Milagre Econômico overseen by Delfim Netto relied on a heterodox, developmentalist model.  The economic expansion relied on low wages, rapidly rising exports, and foreign capital inflows. Delfim Netto originated the phrase "cake theory" in reference to this model: the cake had to grow before it could be distributed. Although the "cake" in his metaphor did grow, it was highly unequally distributed.

Bibliography

References 

1928 births
Living people
Brazilian economists
University of São Paulo alumni
Democratic Social Party politicians
Reform Progressive Party politicians
Progressistas politicians
Brazilian Democratic Movement politicians
Finance Ministers of Brazil
Government ministers of Brazil
Members of the Chamber of Deputies (Brazil) from São Paulo
Ambassadors of Brazil to France
Agriculture ministers of Brazil